Soto may refer to:

Geography
Soto (Aller), parish in Asturias, Spain
Soto (Las Regueras), parish in Asturias, Spain
Soto, Curaçao, Netherlands Antilles
Soto, Russia, a rural locality (a selo) in Megino-Kangalassky District of the Sakha Republic, Russia
Soto de Cerrato, municipality in Palencia Province, Spain
Soto de la Vega, municipality in León Province, Spain
Soto de los Infantes, parish in Asturias, Spain
Soto de Luiña, parish in Asturias, Spain
Soto del Barco (parish), parish in Asturias, Spain
Soto del Real, municipality in Madrid Province, Spain
Soto la Marina, Tamaulipas, municipality in Mexico
Soto Street, in Los Angeles, California
Soto (Los Angeles Metro station), located on Soto Street at the intersection with First St.
Soto y Amío, municipality in León Province, Spain

Groups of people
So'to, indigenous people of the Amazon
Sōtō, the largest of the three traditional sects of Zen in Japanese Buddhism

People with the name

Given name or nickname
Soto Grimshaw (1833–1900), Argentine naturalist
Sotirios Kyrgiakos (born 1979), Retired Greek footballer, nicknamed Soto

Surname
Alberto Soto (born 1990), Mexican footballer
Alejandro Morera Soto (1909–1995), Costa Rican footballer
Algenis Perez Soto, Dominican actor
Andrey Soto (born 2003), Costa Rican footballer
Apolinar de Jesús Soto Quesada (1827–1911), Costa Rican politician
Bernardo Soto Alfaro (1854–1931), president of Costa Rica
Blanca Soto (born 1979), Mexican model
Caitro Soto (1934–2004), Peruvian musician
Carlos Soto Arriví (1959–1978), Puerto Rican independence activist
Cecilia Soto (born 1950), Mexican politician
Cesar Soto (boxer) (born 1971), Mexican boxer, former WBC featherweight champion 
Clemente Soto Vélez (1905–1993), Puerto Rican writer and journalist
Cynthia Soto, American politician
Daniel Garcia Soto, Puerto Rican wrestler
Darren Soto (born 1978), American politician
Eddie Soto (born 1972), American soccer player
Elías M. Soto (1858–1944), Colombian musician and composer
Elkin Soto (born 1980), Colombian footballer 
Elliot Soto (born 1989), American baseball player
Felix Soto Toro (born 1967), Puerto Rican NASA engineer
Fernando Soto-Hay y Garcia
Francisco Puertas Soto (born 1963), Spanish rugby player
Freddy Soto (1970–2005), American comedian
Gabriel Soto (born 1975), Mexican model and actor
Gary Soto (born 1952), American author and poet
Geovany Soto (born 1983), Puerto Rican baseball player
Gregory Soto (born 1995), Dominican baseball pitcher
Héctor Soto (born 1978), Puerto Rican volleyball player
Hernando de Soto (c. 1496–1542), Spanish explorer who was recorded to be the first European to cross the Mississippi River
Hortensia Soto, Mexican-American mathematician
Humberto Soto (born 1980), Mexican boxer
Iván Hernández Soto (born 1980), Spanish footballer
Iván Sánchez-Rico Soto (aka Riki; b. 1980), Spanish footballer
Jafet Soto (born 1976), Costa Rican footballer
Jaime Soto (born 1955), American Roman Catholic bishop
Jay Soto, American jazz guitarist
Jeff Soto (born 1975), American artist
Jeff Scott Soto (born 1965), American singer
Jesús Rafael Soto (1923–2005), Venezuelan artist
Jock Soto, former New York City Ballet principal dancer
Joel Soto (born 1982), Chilean footballer
Jorge Soto (footballer) (born 1971), Peruvian footballer 
Jorge Soto (golfer) (1945–2011), Argentine golfer
Jorge Azanza Soto (born 1982), Spanish bicycle racer
José Soto (disambiguation)
Jose Luis de Quintanar Soto y Ruiz (1772–1837), Mexican military officer
Josu De Solaun Soto (born 1982), Spanish pianist
Juan Soto (born 1998), Dominican baseball player
Juan Soto (referee) (born 1977), Venezuelan football referee
Lindsay Soto (born 1976), American sports journalist
Lisa Soto Visual artist based in Los Angeles, California
Liván Soto (born 2000), Venezuelan baseball player
Lornna Soto (born 1970), Puerto Rican politician
Luis Gutiérrez Soto (1890–1977), Spanish architect
Manuel Ángel Núñez Soto (born 1951), Mexican politician
Marco Aurelio Soto (1846–1908), President of Honduras
Mario Soto (baseball) (born 1956), Dominican baseball player 
Mario Soto (footballer, born 1950), Chilean footballer
Maritza Soto (born 1990), Chilean astronomer
Máximo Soto Hall (1871–1944), Guatemalan novelist
Miriam Blasco Soto (born 1963), Spanish judoka
Nell Soto (1926–2009), American politician
Onell Soto (1932–2015), American Episcopal bishop
Pablo Soto (software developer) (born 1979), Spanish computer scientist
Pedro Blanco Soto (1789–1825), President of Bolivia
Pedro Juan Soto (1928–2002), Puerto Rican writer
Roberto Soto (born 1948), Puerto Rican wrestler
Rodolfo Campo Soto (born 1942), Colombian politician
Santiago Cervera Soto (born 1965), Spanish politician
Sebastian Soto (born 2000), American-Chilean soccer player
Sebastián Soto (born 1991), Argentinian football 
Steve Soto (born 1963), American musician
Talisa Soto (born 1967), American model and actress
Victoria Leigh Soto (1985–2012), American teacher and murder victim

Arts, entertainment, and media
 Soto, the main antagonist in Ice Age (2002 film)
SOTO, a rock band led by Jeff Scott Soto

Other uses
Soto (food) or Coto, a dish originally from Indonesia
 Soto ayam, a chicken soup
 Soto mie, a noodle soup

See also
De Soto (disambiguation)
Sotho (disambiguation)

Spanish-language surnames